Gandy is a unincorporated community in the northwestern corner of Millard County, Utah, United States, located just east of the Nevada-Utah state line.



Description
It is located in the west-central part of Snake Valley.  It is known for Gandy Warm Springs and Gandy Creek, a large spring (15-19 cfs) that comes out of the base of Spring Mountain to the west. It stays around 81–82 degrees Fahrenheit (27–28 Celsius) year-round. Originally known as Smithville, Gandy was renamed in 1925 after Isaac Gandy, the first ranch owner in the area back when this was a post office stop along the Pony Express/Overland Route.

See also

References

External links

Unincorporated communities in Millard County, Utah
Unincorporated communities in Utah
Pony Express stations
Great Basin National Heritage Area